This is a list of schools in Sofia, Bulgaria.

19 High School "Elin Pelin"
22 High School "G. S. Rakovski"
30 High School "Bratya Miladinovi"
Galabov-Gymnasium Sofia
119 High School " Akad. Mihail Arnaudov"
134 Middle School "Dimcho Debelyanov"
164 GPIE "Miguel de Cervantes"
American College of Sofia
American University in Bulgaria Blagoevgrad (private)
Anglo-American School of Sofia
A.S. Popov School of Electronics
Aprilov National High School
English Language School "Geo Milev" (Ruse)
Bacho Kiro High School
Darbi College
First English Language School
Filip Kutev's National School for Folk Arts Kotel
Foreign Language High School "Hristo Botev", Kardzhali, Bulgaria
Hristo Botev Comprehensive School, Targovishte
Language School "Dr. Petar Beron"
Lycée Français de Sofia
Lycée Français Victor Hugo (Bulgaria)
M. V. Lomonosov School of Electrotechnics and Electronics
National Gymnasium of Natural Sciences and Mathematics "Academician Lyubomir Chakalov"
National High School for Folk Arts, Shiroka Laka
National Music School Lyubomir Pipkov
National Learning Complex of Culture with studying Italian language and culture (with participation of the Republic Italy)
National School for Music and Performing Arts, "Prof. Pancho Vladigerov." Burgas
NGDEK
PMG "Ekzarh Antim I"
Professor Marin Drinov Elementary School
Sofia University "St. Kliment of Ochrid" (state university)
Zlatarski International School
St. George International School & Preschool

See also

Education in Bulgaria
List of universities in Bulgaria
Schools and kindergartens in Bulgaria

 
Bulgaria
Bulgaria
Schools
Schools
Schools